The Firestone XR-9, also known by the company designation Model 45, was a 1940s American experimental helicopter built by the Firestone Aircraft Company for the United States Army Air Forces. Only two (the military XR-9B and one civil example) were built.

Development
Originally developed by G & A Aircraft with the co-operation of the United States Army Air Forces' Air Technical Service Command, the G & A Model 45B (designated XR-9 Rotocycle by the Army) was a design for a single-seat helicopter of pod-and-boom configuration. It had a fixed tri-cycle landing gear and three-bladed main and tail rotors. Power would have been supplied by a 126 hp (94 kW) Avco Lycoming XO-290-5 engine. The Model 45C (XR-9A) was the same helicopter with a two-bladed rotor. Neither of the two helicopters were built.  G & A Aircraft was purchased by Firestone in 1943,
and was renamed the Firestone Aircraft Company in 1946.

A revised two-seat design the revised Model 45C (or XR-9B) was built with a three-bladed main rotor and two-seat in tandem. The first aircraft procured by the Army Air Forces in 1946, it was powered by an Avco Lycoming O-290-7 engine and first flew in March of that year.

A civil version, the Model 45D was also built and flown, in anticipation of a postwar boom in aircraft sales. This differed in having the two occupants side-by-side instead of tandem as in the 45C, and was equipped with a  Lycoming engine. The prototype was demonstrated at the 1946 Cleveland National Air Races. A four-seat Model 50, with twin tail rotors, was also projected, but the predicted sales boom did not materialise, and Firestone closed its aircraft manufacturing division.

Variants
Model 45B
Unbuilt single-seat helicopter with three-bladed rotor, Army designation XR-9.
Model 45C
Unbuilt single-seat helicopter with two-bladed rotor, Army designation XR-9A.
Model 45C (revised)
Tandem two-seat helicopter powered by an Avco Lycoming O-290-7 engine and two-bladed rotor, one built as the XR-9B, later re-designated the XH-9B.
Model 45D
Side-by-side two-seat helicopter for civil market, one built.
Model 50.
Four-seat version, not built.
XR-9
Army designation for the unbuilt Model 45B
XR-9A
Army designation for the unbuilt Model 45C
XR-9B
Army designation for the Model 45C (revised), later redesignated XH-9B
XH-9B
XR-9B re-designated in 1948.

Operators
 
United States Army Air Forces

Survivors
The sole Model 45D is in non-display storage at the Army Aviation Museum at Fort Rucker, Alabama. It is painted as an XR-9 46-001.
The sole Model 45D has recently been refurbished and is now on display (without blades installed) at the 
Army Aviation Museum at Fort Rucker, Alabama

Specifications (XR-9B)

See also

References

Notes

Bibliography

 Andrade, John. U.S. Military Aircraft Designations and Serials since 1909. Hinckley, Leicastershire, UK: Midland Counties Publications, 1979. .     
 The Illustrated Encyclopedia of Aircraft (Part Work 1982–1985). London: Orbis Publishing, 1985.
 Lambermont, Paul Marcel. Helicopters and Autogyros of the World. London: Cassell and Company Ltd, 1958. ASIN B0000CJYOA.
 Merriam, Ray. World War II Journal #15: U.S. Warplanes of World War II, Volume 1. Bennington, Vermont: Merriam Press, 2002. .

External links 
 

R-09
1940s United States helicopters
1940s United States military utility aircraft
Aircraft first flown in 1946
Single-engined piston helicopters